Elizabeth Keaney (born 22 December 1991) is an Australian rules footballer playing for the Gold Coast Suns in the AFL Women's (AFLW).

Early life
A hockey player in her younger years, Keaney switched to Australian rules football in 2019 and played club football for Melbourne University as well as the Southern Saints.

AFL Women's career
Keaney made her AFLW debut for the Gold Coast Suns in round 1 of the  2021 AFL Women's season.

References

External links
 

1991 births
Living people
Gold Coast Football Club (AFLW) players